Library Hub Discover is a union catalog operated by Jisc. It replaces Copac and SUNCAT. Its user interface is centred around a simple search engine-like query box.

References

External links 
 https://discover.libraryhub.jisc.ac.uk/

Academic libraries in the United Kingdom
British digital libraries
Jisc
Bibliographic databases and indexes
Databases in the United Kingdom
Higher education in the United Kingdom
Library cataloging and classification
Online databases